Killer is the seventh studio album by American rapper Tech N9ne. It was released on July 1, 2008. Killers album cover pays homage to Michael Jackson’s iconic "Thriller" album cover. With Killer, Tech N9ne has SoundScanned his 1 millionth album independently.

Background
This album was the first album Tech N9ne recorded as a double disc release, containing 32 tracks. (Everready (The Religion) contained two discs, however the second disc was marketed as a bonus disc and not a part of the album itself.) Guests who were featured on the album include Paul Wall, Scarface, Shawnna, Brother J of X-Clan, Mistah F.A.B., Kottonmouth Kings, Hed PE, Krizz Kaliko, Kutt Calhoun, Skatterman & Snug Brim, BG Bulletwound, Liquid Assassin of Grave Plott, and Ice Cube. While Brotha Lynch Hung was confirmed to be a guest on the album early on, he would be absent from the album in the end. It was later revealed that Brotha Lynch Hung was supposed to be on Psycho Bitch II, but he would have been unable to get his verse back to Tech in time, thus he did not appear.  He was instead replaced by Grave Plott's Liquid Assassin.

It features production by producers that have previously collaborated with Tech like Michael "Seven" Summers and David Sanders II, as well as new collaborations such as with Tramaine "YoungFyre" Winfrey, Jonah "Matic Lee" Appleby and Adam "Wyshmaster" Cherrington.

On October 3rd, 2008, the music video for "Like Yeah" premiered on MTVU.com. The video was directed by Estevan Oriol and featured several cameos such as the songs producer Young Fyre, fellow label mates Krizz Kaliko and Kutt Calhoun, actor Danny Trejo, as well as artists Boo-Yaa T.R.I.B.E., C-Bo, Glasses Malone, Krondon, and Skinhead Rob.

The album debuted at #12 on the Billboard 200 with 36,199 copies sold in its first week.

Track listing

Disc one

Disc two

Bonus tracks

SamplesPsycho Bitch II"Psycho Bitch" by Tech N9ne
"The Phantom of the Opera" composed by Andrew Lloyd WebberLast Words"Don't You Want To Stay" composed by Bill WithersPaint a Dark Picture"Tales From the Darkside opening"Hope For a Higher PowerJim Jones's last speech at Jonestown (November 18, 1978). The audio was sampled from the cassette taped recovered by FBI agents in Jonestown, Guyana after the mass suicide. It is nicknamed the 'Jonestown Deathtape' (FBI No. Q 042).Killer'
"Thriller" by Michael Jackson

References

2008 albums
Tech N9ne albums
Albums produced by Seven (record producer)
Horrorcore albums
Strange Music albums